Raymond Riotte (born 16 February 1940 at Sarry, France) is a former French professional road bicycle racer. Riotte was professional from 1966 to 1975 where he won 22 races. Riotte participated in 8 editions of the Tour de France where he won a stage in the 1967 Tour de France as well as wearing the yellow jersey as leader of the general classification for one day. Other victories include two wins in the Ronde de Seignelay, one win in Paris–Camembert and stage wins in Paris–Nice, the Grand Prix du Midi Libre and the Semana Catalane. Riotte was a teammate of Jacques Anquetil, Bernard Thévenet, Raymond Poulidor, Lucien Aimar and of Lucien Van Impe.

Major results

1967
Bordeaux - Saintes
Tour de Seignelay
Tour de France:
Winner stage 12
Wearing yellow jersey for one day
1969
Auxerre
Fourchambault
Paris–Camembert
Saint-Tropez
1970
Garancières-en-Beauce
1971
Saint-Claud
1972
Quilan
1974
Tour de Seignelay

External links 

Palmarès of Raymond Riotte 
Official Tour de France results

French male cyclists
French Tour de France stage winners
1940 births
Living people
Sportspeople from Yonne
Cyclists from Bourgogne-Franche-Comté
21st-century French people
20th-century French people